May 18 - Eastern Orthodox Church calendar - May 20

All fixed commemorations below celebrated on June 1 by Orthodox Churches on the Old Calendar.

For May 19th, Orthodox Churches on the Old Calendar commemorate the Saints listed on May 6.

Saints
 Hieromartyrs Patricius (Patrick), Bishop of Prusa, and with him the Presbyters Acacius, Menander, and Polyenos (c. 100 or c. 362)
 Martyrs Calocerus and Parthenius, brothers (250)
 Martyr Philoterus of Nicomedia (303)
 Martyr Acoluthus of the Thebaid (303)
 Martyr Cyriaca (Kyriake) and the six holy virgin-martyrs in Nicomedia (307)
 Martyr Theotima of Nicomedia (c. 311)
 Saint John, Bishop of the Goths in Crimea (787)

Pre-Schism Western saints
 Martyr Pudens, the senator (c. 160)
 Virgin-Martyr Pudentiana (Potentiana), daughter of Saint Pudens the senator (160)
 Saint Cyril of Trier, Bishop of Trier, (5th century)
 Saint Adolphus (Hadulf), ascetic of the Benedictine Abbey of St. Vaast, in Arras, and later Bishop of Arras Cambrai in the north of France (728)
 Saint Dunstan, Archbishop of Canterbury (988)

Post-Schism Orthodox saints
 Monk-martyrs and Confessors of the Monastery of Panagia of Kantara, on Cyprus, who suffered under the Latins (1231):
 Barnabas, Gennadius, Gerasimus, Germanus (Herman), Theognostus, Theoctistus, Jeremiah, John, Joseph, Conon, Cyril, Maximus and Mark.
 Right-Believing Great Prince Dmitry Donskoy, Great Prince of Moscow (1389)
 Venerable Sinaites of Serbia (from Ravanica) (14th century):
 Romulus, Romanus, Nestor, Sisoes, Zosimas, Gregory, Nicodemus, and Cyril, the Sinaites. - disciples of Gregory of Sinai (Mount Athos).
 Saint Cornelius of Paleostrov, Abbot (1420)
 Saint John (Ignatius), Prince of Uglich, tonsured as Ignatius in Vologda (1522)
 Venerable Cornelius of Komel (Vologda), Abbot and Wonderworker (1537)
 Saint Sergius of Shukhtov (Shukhtom), monk (1609)

New martyrs and confessors
 Hieromartyr Matthew Voznesensky (1919)
 Hieromartyr Innocent (Letayev), Archbishop of Kharkiv (1937)
 Hieromartyr Victor Karakulin (1937)
 Hieromartyr Onuphrius (Gagaliuk), Archbishop of Kursk and Oboyansk (1938), (see also June 1) and:
 Hieromartyr: Anthony, Bishop of Belgorod;
 Hieromartyrs: Mitrophanes Vilgelmsky, Alexander Yeroshov, Michael Deineka, Hippolytus Krasnovsky, Nicholas Kulakov, Basil Ivanov, Nicholas Sadovsky, Maximus Bogdanov, Alexander Saulsky, Paul Bryantsev, and Paul Popov - Priests;
 Martyrs: Michael (Voznesensky) and Gregory (Bogoyavlensky) (1938)
 New Hieromartyr Valentine Lukyanov (1940)
 All New Hieromartyrs of Slobozhanschyna (Slobodskaya) Ukraine (1937,1938,1940,1941)

Other commemorations
 Entrance into Georgia (323) of Saint Nina (Nino), Equal-to-the-Apostles (335)
 Translation of the sacred relics of Saints Julius the Presbyter (401) and Julianus (Giuliano) the Deacon (391)
 Repose of Schemamonk Cyriacus of Valaam (1798)
 Repose of Righteous Nicholas Rynin of Vologda (1837)
 Commemoration of the ascetics of St. Anthony of Syadem Monastery: Elias (also of Valaam), Theophanes, and Dionysius.
 Synaxis of Hieromartyrs of Kharkov.
 Slaying of Priest John Karastamatis of Santa Cruz (1985)  (see also: May 6)

Icon gallery

Notes

References

Sources 
 May 19/June 1. Orthodox Calendar (PRAVOSLAVIE.RU).
 June 1 / May 19. HOLY TRINITY RUSSIAN ORTHODOX CHURCH (A parish of the Patriarchate of Moscow).
 Dr. Alexander Roman. May. Calendar of Ukrainian Orthodox Saints (Ukrainian Orthodoxy - Українське Православ'я).
 May 19. Latin Saints of the Orthodox Patriarchate of Rome.
 May 19. The Roman Martyrology.
Greek Sources
 Great Synaxaristes:  19 ΜΑΪΟΥ. ΜΕΓΑΣ ΣΥΝΑΞΑΡΙΣΤΗΣ.
  Συναξαριστής. 19 Μαΐου. ECCLESIA.GR. (H ΕΚΚΛΗΣΙΑ ΤΗΣ ΕΛΛΑΔΟΣ). 
Russian Sources
  1 июня (19 мая). Православная Энциклопедия под редакцией Патриарха Московского и всея Руси Кирилла (электронная версия). (Orthodox Encyclopedia - Pravenc.ru).
  19 мая (ст.ст.) 1 июня 2013 (нов. ст.). Русская Православная Церковь Отдел внешних церковных связей. (DECR).

May in the Eastern Orthodox calendar